The discography of American hip hop duo Run the Jewels consists of four studio albums, two remix albums and fifteen singles.

Their debut studio album Run the Jewels charted on Billboard charts such as Top R&B/Hip-Hop Albums and Top Rap Albums while their sophomore studio album appeared on the aforementioned charts, the Billboard 200 and the Belgian Ultratop Flanders chart. Their third studio album, which is also their most successful, charted in eight countries including the United States, Australia and the United Kingdom. The album was also their first number one on the Billboard hip hop album chart and it peaked in the top 50 in Ireland and the Netherlands, the top 40 in Australia, Belgium, Canada and the United Kingdom, the top 30 in Scotland and the top 15 in the United States.

Albums

Studio albums

Remix album

Extended plays

Singles

As lead artist 

Notes

As featured artist 

Notes

Guest appearances

Music videos

As lead artist

As featured artist

References

External links 
Run the Jewels on iTunes

Discographies of American artists